List of rivers flowing in the province of Central Java, Indonesia:

In alphabetical order

See also 
 List of rivers of Indonesia
 List of rivers of Java

References

External links

 List of river area systems in Central Java

 
Central Java